Lillian Evanti (August 12, 1890 – December 6, 1967), was an African American opera singer.  Evanti was the first African American to perform with a major European opera company.

Life
She was born in Washington, D.C., and graduated from Armstrong Manual Training School, where her father, W. Bruce Evans, was the first principal. Her paternal grandfather, Henry Evans was born in North Carolina as a free black man and later moved to Oberlin, Ohio where he helped with the Underground Railroad. Evanti's maternal grandfather John H. Brooks was elected to the House of Delegates in 1874 and defeated Frederick Douglas Jr. Although gifted in music, in 1908 Lillian entered Miner Teachers College (now University of the District of Columbia) for the education of black elementary school teachers. In her time there she met Georgia Douglas Johnson, a future poet and literary figure that Evanti would later consult with in writing songs. 
 
She graduated from Howard University with a bachelor's degree in music. At her commencement in May 1917 she sang French, German, English as well as American songs that brought her national attention by the black press such as the New York Age (being a woman of color, she was not discovered by white media for over a decade after this performance). With the support from her husband, Lillian set sail for Paris in 1924 to begin her operatic journey. In an effort to sound more European she combined her maiden name "Evans" and her married name "Tibbs" to create her new stage name Evanti. As an African American classical singer in America, there was little success for her outside of the black community and she hoped that in France she would finally find her voice. In Paris, Lillian studied voice with French soprano Gabrielle Ritter-Ciampi and within the year moved to Nice where her instructor advised her to audition at the local opera houses. Evanti, a soprano, sang at the Belasco Theatre in 1926 with Marian Anderson.
She debuted in 1925 in Delibes's Lakmé at Nice, France. Although she was receiving praise in Europe, only black newspapers were picking up her success in America. In an article by The Chicago Defender (national edition) on Sept 26, 1925, Evanti goes into detail about the unknown color prejudice she experienced in France after her debut. "Distinguished Parisians understand us " says Madame Evanti "there is no such thing as color prejudice, especially among the upper classes." The article then goes into a story of her making her first public appearance in a joint recital with a violinist at the home of the distinguished Salmon family " I feel that Mme.Salmon understands very thoroughly the race question in America. She has made a special study of it and is very much interested in the general progress of the Negro."

As Lillian's popularity grew she sang opera at Toulon, Montpelier and Monte Carlo where in 1926 she was a guest artist of the Monte-Carlo Philharmonic Orchestra. Finally, in 1927 she was invited to sing in Paris. The Chicago Defender reviewed her singing the same role at the Trianon-Lyrique in Paris during Christmas Eve of 1927 "When the posters all over Paris announced that an American would interpret "Lakme" on Christmas Eve night, the theater-going public began to wonder. An American interpreting the leading role at the Trianon-Lyrique? That's one of the things which almost never happen. She was no longer an American singing in French, she was an artist of rare ability; she was all that Delibes himself could have desired in his heroine." During her time in Europe, Evanti would return home to Washington every summer and would give concerts in the area. Along with spirituals, Lillian presented a wide range of repertoire including works by Handel, Scarlatti, Bellini, Rameau which grabbed the attention of a few "white" papers, although they neglected to identify her as a black singer.

As Evanti's reputation and demand grew, her marriage began to suffer. Her husband  Roy Tibbs who was once enthusiastic in supporting her career was now beginning to resent her success. In September 1925 while visiting her family she found that Roy had moved out of their house and was terribly ill. After nursing him back to health, Lillian returned to France only to come back again two years later to a cold and empty house. Evanti decided to sue Roy for separate maintenance. In an article by The New York Amsterdam News on August 22, 1927 " she sought to return to him and that he refused to see her, that when she went to see him he left the house and that she and her son remained. Mrs. Tibbs stated that from 1924 to 1927 she did not receive more than $225 from her husband for her support and assistance maintenance. She says her husband after urging her to pursue her career has tried to make it appear that her ambition is the cause of their separation." Lillian's petition was granted by the Supreme Court of the District of Columbia and Roy Tibbs was ordered to pay monthly child support. After her divorce, Evanti continued to travel with her mother and son. As an opera singer and concert artist, she toured throughout Europe and South America.

In early 1932 she was invited by Gatti-Casazza, general manager of the Metropolitan Opera Company, to audition at their house. Lillian left Europe at the height of her career to sing opera in her native country. Unfortunately, they refused to give her a contract. With all of her European success, it was hard to believe that the highest opera house in America would deny this diva their stage. She auditioned for them two more times, the last time in 1946 at the age of fifty-six. They never offered her a contract, due to racial segregation. Nevertheless, Evanti continued to sing from 1932 to 1935 in the United States to praise and acclaim for the "tonal beauty of her voice.", including a private recital at the White House for an audience of Eleanor Roosevelt and her friends.

In 1943, she performed with the Watergate Theater barge on the Potomac River.
In 1944, she appeared at The Town Hall (New York City).
She received acclaim as Violetta in Verdi's La traviata as produced by the National Negro Opera Company in 1945. In an article by The Chicago Defender (National edition) on August 14, 1943 "Miss Evanti expressed a desire to see more of her race become interested in opera. She explained that "La Traviata" is offering her an opportunity to translate the role of Violetta in English, in order that a better understanding will be afforded those witnessing the performance."

Lillian continued to give concerts and recitals all over the country and in the 1940s began to spend more time composing. In 1942 Evanti visited notorious blues composer W.C Handy and thus began a musical relationship between composer and publisher. The Handy Brothers published Lillian's "The Mighty Rapture", "The Twenty-third Psalm", "Thank You Again and Again", "Speak to Him Thou", and "High Flight". Eventually, she published her own music as owner and founder of the Columbia Music Bureau in Washington.

In 1963, she walked with her friend Alma Thomas in the March on Washington. She is also a member of Zeta Phi Beta sorority.

In the post World War II era her life changed drastically when her husband, mother and brother died all within five years of each other. Her grief- and the decline of professional demands-gave Lillian the chance to grow closer with her son, his wife and her two grandchildren. Although she was no longer singing on grand opera stages, Evanti became involved in the music life within the D.C community and brought her love and passion to the "Evanti Chorale". Lillian's prologue to her unpublished autobiography can be found at the Center for Black Music Research at Columbia College Chicago.

Family
She married Roy W. Tibbs, a former director of the Coleridge-Taylor Society, a Washington D. C. African-American chorus founded in honor of the composer Samuel Coleridge Taylor. They lived at 1910 Vermont Avenue in the Shaw Neighborhood of Northwest, Washington, D.C., which is now known as the Evans-Tibbs House and is listed in the National Register of Historic Places. They had a grandson, Thurlow E. Tibbs, Jr, born 1952.

References

Sources

Eileen Southern, The Music of Black Americans: A History. W. W. Norton & Company; 3rd edition. 
Lillian Evanti photographs and other material at Columbia College, Chicago 
Madame Lillian Evanti seated on train in Europe.
Smith, Eric Ledell. "Lillian Evanti: Washington's African-American Diva". Washington History. 11 (Spring/Summer 1999): 24-43, accessed March 6, 2017.

1890 births
1967 deaths
20th-century African-American women singers
20th-century American women opera singers
African-American women opera singers
Howard University alumni
American operatic sopranos
People from Shaw (Washington, D.C.)
Singers from Washington, D.C.